James Hubert Ramsay, 17th Earl of Dalhousie,  (born 17 January 1948), styled Lord Ramsay between 1950 and 1999, is a Scottish landowner.

Biography
Dalhousie was born the son of the 16th Earl of Dalhousie by his wife, Margaret Elizabeth Mary Stirling. His mother was a sister of SAS pioneer and World War II hero Sir David Stirling. Dalhousie was educated at Ampleforth College in North Yorkshire.

In 1999, upon the death of his father, Dalhousie succeeded to the earldom of Dalhousie and became the 17th Earl. In 2009, the Earl was appointed Lord Steward of Her Majesty's Household, following in succession to the 5th Duke of Abercorn. In 2012, he was appointed as Commander of the Venerable Order of Saint John (CStJ) in 2012. He is Vice Lord-Lieutenant of Angus in Scotland. He relinquished his appointment as Lord Steward on 22 February 2023 and was succeeded by the 7th Earl of Rosslyn.

The Earl is Chief of the Clan Ramsay. His wife, the Countess, is a Patroness of the Royal Caledonian Ball.

Marriage and issue
The Earl is married to Marilyn Davina Butter, daughter of Sir David and Lady Butter, by whom he has two daughters and a son, being:
Lady Lorna Theresa Ramsay (6 February 1975), married and has issue
Lady Alice Magdalene Ramsay (10 August 1977), married and has issue
Simon David Ramsay, Lord Ramsay (18 April 1981), married and has issue

The Earl and his family reside for much of the year in London. Otherwise, they prefer to live in Brechin, a property in Angus, Scotland, that has been in the Maule-Ramsay family since the 12th century, and which is opened for one month each year to the public. Brechin Castle was listed for sale in 2022, through Savills, the real estate company.

The family seat, Dalhousie Castle, a 13th-century fortress near Edinburgh, is now a luxury hotel, complete with spa and falconry. Much of the family's immovable properties have been vested into Dalhousie Estates, a family-run business engaged in farming, property letting and forestry, including shooting, fishing and deer stalking. The business venture provides employment for over 90 people.

Arms

References

External links

Dalhousie Estates

Living people
1948 births
Commanders of the Order of St John
James
Deputy Lieutenants of Angus
Earls of Dalhousie
People educated at Ampleforth College

Dalhousie